Burr Oak is an unincorporated community in Athens County, Ohio, United States.

History
A post office called Burr Oak was established in 1887, and remained in operation until 1911. The community was named for burr oak trees near the original town site.

References

Unincorporated communities in Athens County, Ohio
Unincorporated communities in Ohio
1887 establishments in Ohio
Populated places established in 1887